Samuel William Koster (December 29, 1919 – January 23, 2006) was a career officer in the United States Army. He attained the rank of major general, and was most notable for his service as commander of the Americal Division and Superintendent of the United States Military Academy. A veteran of World War II, the Korean War, and the Vietnam War, Koster was slated for promotion to lieutenant general before receiving a reduction in rank to brigadier general and retiring as a result of his efforts to minimize the details of the My Lai Massacre.

Early life
Koster was born in West Liberty, Iowa on December 29, 1919, and graduated from West Liberty High School in 1937.  He graduated from the United States Military Academy in 1942 and was commissioned as a second lieutenant of Infantry.

Start of career
After completing his Infantry Officer Basic Course, Koster was assigned to the 413th Infantry Regiment, a unit of the 104th Infantry Division. After completing organization and training at Camp Adair, Oregon, the 413th served in Europe until the end of World War II. Koster took part in four campaigns, and advanced through the positions of platoon leader, company commander, regimental staff officer, battalion executive officer, battalion commander, and regimental executive officer. During the war he also completed his Infantry Officer Advanced Course and graduated from the United States Army Command and General Staff College.

Post-World War II
After the war Koster served with the 20th and 2d Armored Divisions at Fort Hood, Texas, including assignments as a battalion commander and division staff officer.  He then served in the Intelligence staff section (G-2) at the Far East Command headquarters in Japan. After returning to the United States in 1949, he was assigned as a tactical officer at West Point.

Korean War
During the Korean War Koster returned to Asia, serving with both Operations and Training (G-3) and G-2 staff sections of the Far East Command and the Eighth United States Army. He was then assigned to direct Eighth Army's guerrilla warfare operations against North Korea.

Post-Korean War
After the war Koster completed the Armed Forces Staff College. He was subsequently posted to the Office of the U.S. Army G-3, where he served for three years in the Operations Directorate.

In July, 1956 Koster was assigned to Supreme Headquarters Allied Powers Europe (SHAPE) in Paris, where he served as deputy secretary and then secretary of the staff. In 1959 he returned to the United States and began attendance at the National War College, from which he graduated in 1960.

In the early 1960s Koster was assigned to Fort Benning, Georgia, where he served as commander of the 29th Infantry Battle Group, followed by command of the 1st Infantry Brigade. He then served as director of the Infantry Center and School's Command and Staff Department, followed by assignment as chief of staff of the Infantry Center and School.

Koster was assigned to Eighth United States Army in South Korea in 1964, serving as deputy assistant G-3 and assistant G-3. In April 1966, he was assigned as director of the Plans and Programs Division in the Office of the Army's Assistant Chief of Staff for Force Development.

By 1967 he had attained the rank of Major General, and at the height of the Vietnam War was assigned to command Task Force Oregon. The task force was later reorganized as the reactivated 23rd Infantry (Americal) Division.

My Lai Massacre

On March 16, 1968, a company of Americal Division troops led by Captain Ernest Medina and Lieutenant William Calley slaughtered hundreds of civilians in a South Vietnamese hamlet known as My Lai (referred to as "Pinkville" by the troops). While no official count was made, soldiers and investigators later estimated that 350 to 500 women, children and old men were killed with grenades, rifles, bayonets, and machine guns; some were burned to death in their huts. Corpses were piled in ditches that became mass graves. No Viet Cong were ever discovered in the village and no shots were fired in opposition. To many Americans at home, the massacre marked the moral nadir of the war in Southeast Asia and became a pivotal event in the conflict.

Koster was not on the ground at My Lai, but he did fly over the village in a helicopter while the soldiers moved in, and afterward. He later testified that he believed only about 20 civilians had died, although he also said that he was told about "wild shooting" and about a confrontation between ground troops and a helicopter pilot (later identified as Hugh Thompson) who tried to stop the killing of civilians. Koster later ordered subordinates to file reports on the incident, but they were incomplete, and one was even lost. Worse, these reports were never sent to headquarters, as military protocol required, until an Americal veteran named Ron Ridenhour triggered a secret high-level investigation with a three-page letter he sent to the Pentagon, the president, and members of Congress in March 1969.

Early in 1970, Koster and 13 other officers were charged with trying to cover up the massacre. Charges were dropped, however, after the Army determined that he "did not show any intentional abrogation of responsibilities". Koster, who was the Superintendent of the United States Military Academy at West Point at the time, was due to be promoted to the rank of lieutenant general (three stars), but his involvement in the My Lai cover up caused him to be denied this promotion, and further inquiries led the way to his demotion. He was subsequently censured in writing, stripped of a Distinguished Service Medal and demoted to brigadier general for failing to conduct an adequate investigation. Koster's appeal was turned down.

Later life
Following his demotion, Koster was reassigned as deputy commander of Maryland's Aberdeen Proving Ground, in charge of Army weapons testing.  He retired from the military in November 1973 with the rank of brigadier general. His decorations included the Silver Star, Bronze Star Medal, and Legion of Merit.

After his retirement, Koster worked for 12 years as an executive vice president for the power transmission division of Koppers and Hanson Industries in Baltimore. In this role, Koster was responsible for the oversight of electricity plants in the United States and Canada.

Death and burial
In retirement Koster continued to reside in Maryland.  He died in Annapolis on January 23, 2006.  He is buried at West Point Cemetery, Sec. 18, Row G, Grave 084B.

Family
In 1943, Koster married Cherie Kadgihn (1922–2018), who was originally from Iowa City, Iowa. They were the parents of five children—sons Samuel Jr., Robert, and Jack, all of whom became army officers, and daughters Susanne Henley-Ross and Nancy Sroka.

Cultural references
Koster is mentioned by name in the first stanza of Pete Seeger's Vietnam protest song "Last Train to Nuremberg".

See also

References

External sources

1919 births
2006 deaths
United States Army generals
United States Army personnel of World War II
United States Army personnel of the Korean War
United States Army personnel of the Vietnam War
Mỹ Lai massacre
United States Army personnel who were court-martialed
Superintendents of the United States Military Academy
Recipients of the Distinguished Service Medal (US Army)
Recipients of the Silver Star
Recipients of the Legion of Merit
Recipients of the Croix de Guerre 1939–1945 (France)
United States Military Academy alumni
United States Army Command and General Staff College alumni
Joint Forces Staff College alumni
National War College alumni
Deaths from kidney cancer
Burials at West Point Cemetery
American people of Dutch descent
People from Muscatine County, Iowa
Military personnel from Iowa
20th-century American academics